Helmuth Sørensen Nyborg (born 5 January 1937) is a Danish psychologist and athlete. He is a former professor of developmental psychology at Aarhus University, Denmark and Olympic canoeist.  His main research topic is the connection between hormones and intelligence. Among other things, he has worked on increasing the intelligence of girls with Turner's syndrome by giving them estrogen.

Nyborg is a controversial figure among the Danish public for his research on topics such as the inheritance of intelligence and the relationship between sex and intelligence. In 2004 he wrote an article in Personality and Individual Differences which claimed a five-point average IQ difference in favour of men, This led to strong reactions, for example in an editorial by the Danish newspaper Politiken. In 2011, he argued in an article that migration from third world countries to Denmark would cause a dysgenic effect on the country's average IQ over time.

Nyborg has argued that white people tend to be more intelligent than black people, that immigration from non-Western countries leads to a decline in the average intelligence of the receiving Western country, and that atheists tend to be more intelligent than religious people. His papers have been criticized within and outside academia and in 2013, the Danish Committees for Scientific Dishonesty (DCSD) ruled that he committed scientific misconduct in his paper The decay of Western civilization: Double relaxed Darwinian selection. This decision was later overturned by a Danish court, clearing him of the charges.

2005 controversy 

Nyborg's 2005 paper Sex-related differences in general intelligence g, brain size, and social status  was published in Personality and Individual Differences. Nyborg was suspended following criticism of his research. Aarhus University assembled a committee to investigate, and found him innocent of fraud, but guilty of "grossly negligent behavior" and gave him a severe reprimand. He was eventually acquitted by the Danish Committees on Scientific Dishonesty of the charges of scientific misconduct and the university was forced to reinstall him to his chair. On 21 September 2006, the university gave Nyborg a "severe reprimand", revoked his suspension, and declared the case closed. According to a 2006 news story in Science: "Colleagues from around the world have rallied to his defense, accusing the university of having political motives, and claiming that the errors in his research were trivial."

2011 controversy
In 2011 Nyborg published "The Decay of Western Civilization: Double Relaxed Darwinian Selection" in the journal Personality and Individual Differences, arguing that Denmark was likely to experience a dysgenic effect on intelligence due to immigration from the Middle East. Following publication he was indicted by the Danish Committees on Scientific Dishonesty (DCSD), accused of scientific misconduct and of plagiarism by a number of scholars from the University of Aarhus. They accused him of using a statistical model for the demographic prognoses that was based on the work of Jørn Ebbe Vig, without giving credit, and for using misleading statistics by assuming that Middle Eastern people in Denmark maintained the same reproduction rates as in their countries of origin. Vig had previously published similar demographic models in the journal of Den Danske Forening, a Danish nationalist organization. As a result on 31 October 2013 he was convicted of scientific misconduct by the Danish Council for Scientific Misconduct after a two-year investigation. They found him guilty on two charges out of six in total, of which the last was "various other complaints". The first was that he had published the paper without crediting as co-author Jørn Ebbe Vig, whose previously published texts were incorporated into the article without acknowledgement. The DCSD considered that Vig should have been credited, because of the substantial contribution, in terms of data, method and text. Nyborg stated that he had offered co-authorship to Vig, but that the offer was declined and Vig had requested not to be mentioned, making Nyborg choose to publish it himself. The second charge was that Nyborg had neglected to mention in the methodology section that he had converted a total fertility rate into a crude birth rate, a mistake which, because of its consequences, the DCSD considered to be equivalent to constructing data without acknowledging having done so, or substituting fictive data. When Nyborg learned that this was a problem, he sent an addendum to the journal, which is common practice when errors or omissions are found in published papers. However, the DCSD still considered it scientific misconduct, since they considered it an example of gross negligence. In 2015 the journal published an editorial commenting on the paper concluding that Nyborg had not committed fraud or plagiarism. This conclusion was based on the verdict of an ad hoc working group consisting of Ian Deary, Jelte Wicherts, John Loehlin and William Revelle.

Nyborg then sued the DCSD to get the verdict reversed, won his case in March 2016, and in addition was awarded costs of over 200,000 kr (approximately US$25,000).

Olympic kayaking
Nyborg competed as a sprint canoer in the early 1960s. He won a bronze medal for Denmark in the K-1 4×500 m relay at the 1960 Summer Olympics in Rome.

Publications

He is the editor of a 2003 festschrift, The Scientific Study of General Intelligence: Tribute to Arthur Jensen, published by Pergamon Press. In 2012 he was the editor of a special issue of Personality and Individual Differences dedicated to celebrating the 80th birthday of another controversial psychometrician, English psychologist, Richard Lynn.

See also
 Sex and intelligence

References

1937 births
Academic staff of Aarhus University
Canoeists at the 1960 Summer Olympics
Danish male canoeists
Danish psychologists
Factors related to intelligence
Intelligence researchers
Living people
Medalists at the 1960 Summer Olympics
Olympic bronze medalists for Denmark
Olympic canoeists of Denmark
Olympic medalists in canoeing
Race and intelligence controversy
Proponents of scientific racism
Controversies in Denmark